Pedro Rodríguez González (born 12 August 1994 in Zaragoza) is a former Spanish Grand Prix motorcycle racer. He currently races in the RFME Superstock 1000 Championship aboard a BMW S1000RR, and has previously competed in the Spanish CEV 125GP Championship, the Spanish Moto3 Championship, the Spanish Moto2 Championship, the European Superstock 600 Championship and the RFME Superstock 600 Championship.

Career statistics

By season

Races by year

References

External links
 Profile on motogp.com

Living people
1994 births
Spanish motorcycle racers
125cc World Championship riders